Giffard was one of 18 s built for the French Navy in the first decade of the 20th century.

Design and description
The Pluviôse class were built as part of the French Navy's 1905 building program to a double-hull design by Maxime Laubeuf. The submarines displaced  surfaced and  submerged. Their crew numbered 2 officers and 23 enlisted men.

For surface running, the boats were powered by two  triple-expansion steam engines, each driving one propeller shaft using steam provided by two Du Temple boilers. When submerged each propeller was driven by a  electric motor.

The first six boats completed were armed with a single  internal bow torpedo tube, but this was deleted from the rest of the submarines after an accident with their sister  in 1909. All of the boats were fitted with six 450 mm external torpedo launchers; the pair firing forward were fixed outwards at an angle of seven degrees and the rear pair had an angle of five degrees. Following a ministerial order on 22 February 1910, the aft tubes were reversed so they too fired forward, but at an angle of eight degrees. The other launchers were a rotating pair of Drzewiecki drop collars in a single mount positioned on top of the hull at the stern. They could traverse 150 degrees to each side of the boat. The Pluviôse-class submarines carried eight torpedoes.

Construction and career
Gay-Lussac, named after the 19th-century inventor Joseph Louis Gay-Lussac, was ordered on 24 August 1905 from the Arsenal de Rochefort. The submarine was laid down in 1906, launched on 17 March 1910 and commissioned on 14 January 1911.

Citations

Bibliography

Pluviôse-class submarines
World War I submarines of France
1910 ships